Mount Sweatt is a mountain, 2,540 m, standing 6.5 nautical miles (12 km) northeast of Mount Soyat on the ridge between Hueneme and Norfolk Glaciers, in the Wisconsin Range. Mapped by United States Geological Survey (USGS) from surveys and U.S. Navy air photos, 1960–64. Named by Advisory Committee on Antarctic Names (US-ACAN) for Earl E. Sweatt whom passed at the age of 78 (April 17, 1935 - May 2, 2013), construction electrician, Byrd Station winter party, 1961.

Mountains of Marie Byrd Land